Stolen Holiday is a 1937 film directed by Michael Curtiz and starring Kay Francis, Claude Rains and Ian Hunter. It is loosely based on the Stavisky Affair, a French political scandal. A Russian con artist worms his way into the upper reaches of French society, but is finally exposed, with tragic consequences.

Plot
In 1931 Paris, Nicole Picot (Kay Francis), a model for a fashionable dress shop, is hired by nearly-penniless Stefan Orloff (Claude Rains) to help persuade a financier to fund his ambitious plans. By 1934, Stefan has established an investment bank; in gratitude, he provides the capital that Nicole needs to set up her own business and become a successful dress designer (though she insists on paying him back).

British diplomat Anthony Wayne (Ian Hunter) romances Nicole and wins her heart. However, when Stefan's crooked schemes start to unravel, he asks Nicole to marry him without divulging his main motive: the attendance of her influential friends at the well-publicized ceremony would bolster public confidence in him and buy him time. She agrees, out of friendship alone, much to the distress of her friend and assistant, Suzanne (Alison Skipworth). It is too late. At their wedding, Stefan's closest confederate, Francis Chalon (Walter Kingsford), is taken away by the police for questioning, and the other guests hastily depart.

Knowing that Chalon can incriminate him, Stefan goes into hiding at a remote chateau. However, he makes a mistake, sending a letter to Nicole asking her to join him. She does so, despite Anthony's protests. Nicole gets Stefan to admit the truth, though he insists he does love her. When he sees that the police have followed Nicole and have surrounded the chateau, he excuses himself. To spare her from being dragged down with him, he goes outside. As he expected, he is shot and killed, though it is staged to look like a suicide to avoid causing further embarrassment to the government.

Afterward, Anthony persists and finally gets Nicole to agree to marry him.

Cast
 Kay Francis as Nicole Picot
 Claude Rains as Stefan Orloff
 Ian Hunter as Anthony Wayne
 Alison Skipworth as Suzanne
 Alexander D'Arcy as Leon Anatole
 Betty Lawford as Helen Tuttle
 Walter Kingsford as Francis Chalon
 Charles Halton as LeGrande
 Frank Reicher as Charles Ranier
 Frank Conroy as Dupont
 Egon Brecher as Bergery
 Wedgwood Nowell as M. Borel

Preservation
In addition to being held by Warner Bros., the film is preserved in the Library of Congress collection.

References

External links
 
 
 
 

1937 romantic drama films
1937 films
American romantic drama films
American black-and-white films
Drama films based on actual events
1930s English-language films
Films directed by Michael Curtiz
Films scored by Heinz Roemheld
Films set in Paris
Films à clef
Warner Bros. films
1930s American films